Apolobamba (Cordillera (de) Apolobamba) is a mountain range in the South American Andes.

Geographical Location
It is located in the eastern borderland of Peru and Bolivia. On the Bolivian side it is situated in the La Paz Department and on the Peruvian side it lies in the Puno Region. It stretches across a distance of 50 km from east to west and 30 km from north to south.

Curva, the main locality of the Kallawaya-people, is located 3,800 m above sea level.

Mountains 
Other notable peaks are:

 Akamani, 
 Allqamarini, 
 Apachita Pura Pura,  
 Asu Q'arani, 
 Canisaya, 
 Chawpi Urqu, 
 Choquechambi, 
 Chuquyu, 
 Cuchillo, 
 Chapi, 
 Chocñacota, 
 Iskay Cruz Rit'i, 
 Cunuyo, 
 Jach'a Waracha, 
 Janq'u Uma, 
 Ichocollo, 
 Katantika, 
 Kulli Pata, 
 Kuntur Ikiña, 
 K'usilluni, 
 Locopauchenta, 
 Losojocha, 
 Machu Such'i Qhuchi, 
 Manqu Qhapaq
 Nubi, 
 Palomani, 
 Punta Yavre, 
 Qala Phusa, 
 Jajahuaycho, 
 Jorhuari, 
 Qutañani, 
 Qillwa Quta, 
 Q'umir Pata, 
 Q'uru Qhini
 Rit'i Apachita, 
 Riti Urmasca, 
 Ritipata, 
 Rit'iyuq, 
 Salluyu, 
 Sorapata, 
 Ulla Qhaya, 
 Wanaku
 Huanacuni, 
 Wank'uchiri, 
 Waracha, 
 Warini
 Wila Kunka, 
 Vilacota, 
 Huejo, 
 Yanauma, 
 Yana Urqu

Lakes 
The largest lake in the range is Such'i Lake. Such'i is what the Aymara and Quechua people call a little fish which lives in the cold waters of the lakes and rivers of the Altiplano. Other lakes are listed below:

 Ch'uxña Quta (Curva)
 Ch'uxñaquta (Putina)
 Cololo Lake
 K'ayrani Quta
 K'iski Quta
 Qachu Quta
 Qaqa Waychu
 Qillwa Quta
 Q'illu Qucha

See also 
 Apolobamba Integrated Management Natural Area
 Cordillera Real
 Cordillera Kimsa Cruz

References

External links

"Trekking in the Cordillera Apolobamba"
"Mountaineering information for the Cordillera Apolobamba (British Expedition)"
"Mountaineering information for the Cordillera Apolobamba (Swedish Expedition)"

Mountain ranges of the Andes
Mountain ranges of Bolivia
Mountain ranges of Peru
 
Mountain ranges of Puno Region